Brandon Bailing (born ) is a South African rugby union player that played for the  in the Currie Cup and the  in the Rugby Challenge in 2017, making a single appearance in each competition. His regular position is centre.

References

South African rugby union players
Living people
1991 births
People from Vryheid
Rugby union centres
Sharks (Currie Cup) players
Rugby union players from KwaZulu-Natal